Bicycle and human powered vehicle museums by country.

Australia
The Canberra Bicycle Museum – Dickson, Canberra closed in 2010. Much of the collection was purchased by avid collector James Macdonald (dec) of Toowoomba. The collection is now on display at the Highfields Pioneer Village in Highfields QLD.

Austria
Fahrradmuseum Retz, Retz, Hollabrunn district, Lower Austria

Belgium
 The Wieler Museum Roeselare

Brazil
 The Bicycle Joinville Museum, Joinville, Santa Catarina

Canada
The Bicycle Forest, Waterloo, Ontario 
Canada Science and Technology Museum, Ottawa, Ontario
Huron Bicycle Museum, Kincardine, Ontario

Denmark
Danmarks Cykelmuseet

Estonia
Estonian Bicycle Museum

France
Musée de la Moto et du Vélo - Collection Maurice Chapleur, Amnéville, Lorraine 
Musée du Vélo La Belle Echappée, Fresnaye-sur-Chédouet, Sarthe, Pays de la Loire, a bicycle museum dedicated to competitive cycling and the Tour de France in particular. Bicycles and jerseys of the famous riders, video displays.
Musée du Vélocipède, Cadouin, Dordogne

Germany
Deutsches Fahrradmuseum Bad Brückenau, Bad Brückenau, Bavaria 
Fahrradmuseum & Mechanisches Museum, Plauen, Saxony 
Fahrradmuseums Hüttenheim, Willanzheim, Bavaria 
PedalWelt, Heimbuchenthal, Bavaria
Rheinhessischen Fahrradmuseum, Gau-Algesheim, Rhenish Hesse

Japan
Bicycle Museum Cycle Center, Saikai, Osaka
Yagami Bicycle Museum, Nagoya
Yokohama Bicycle Museum, Yokohama

Lithuania
 , Šiauliai

Netherlands
Velorama (Nationaal Fietsmuseum Velorama), Nijmegen, Gelderland

Poland
Muzeum Nietypowych Rowerów, Gołąb, Puławy County

Portugal

United Kingdom
The National Cycle Museum – Llandrindod Wells

United States 
Bicycle Heaven, Pittsburgh, PA
Bicycle Museum of America – New Bremen, Ohio
 Brown Cycles, Grand Junction, Colorado
Golden Oldy Cyclery & Sustainability, Golden, Colorado 
Houston Bicycle Museum, Houston, Texas(closed) 
Little Congress Bicycle Museums, Cumberland Gap, Tennessee 
Marin Museum of Bicycling, Fairfax, California, includes the Mountain Bike Hall of Fame
The Metz Bicycle Museum, Freehold, New Jersey (closed) 
New England Muscle Bicycle Museum – Bloomfield, Connecticut (closed) 
Old Spokes Home, Burlington, Vermont
Pedaling History Bicycle Museum, Orchard Park (closed)
Three Oaks Bicycle Museum – Three Oaks, Michigan
United States Bicycling Hall of Fame, Davis, California
The Velocipede Museum – Newburgh, New York
Lane Motor Museum  Nashville, Tennessee

See also 
 Outline of cycling

References

Bicycle and human powered vehicle museums
Bicycle and human powered vehicle museums
Museums